St Virgil's College is an independent Catholic primary and secondary day school for boys, located over two campuses in Austins Ferry and Hobart, Tasmania, Australia. Established in 1911 by the Congregation of Christian Brothers, the College has a non-selective enrolment policy and caters for approximately 680 students, from Years 3 to 11, with 120 at the junior campus and 480 at the senior campus.

St Virgil's is affiliated with the Junior School Heads Association of Australia (JSHAA), the Association of Heads of Independent Schools of Australia (AHISA), and is a member of the Sports Association of Tasmanian Independent Schools (SATIS). Oversight of the school is administered by the Archdiocese of Hobart, Tasmanian Catholic Education Office, and the school is a member of Edmund Rice Education Australia.

History 
St Virgil's College was formally opened on 22 January 1911 by The Christian Brothers. Leo Doyle was the first student admitted to the college. At is foundation the college was a boarding school for boys located in Barrack Street, Hobart. The boarding section of the college was closed in 1970 and since then St Virgil's College has been a day school only.

In 1962, another campus was opened in Austins Ferry, offering junior secondary grades (Grades 7–9) on a riverside property of 30 hectares. In 1991, three Grade 10 streams were also added. 2012 marks the 50 year celebrations for the campus.

The Barrack Street campus then expanded for students from Grades 7–12 until 1994 when, under the Southern Secondary Schools Restructuring Plan, the campus no longer accepted enrolments for Grade 7. At the end of 1994, Grades 8, 11 and 12 ceased to run at the Barrack Street campus, and  all secondary grades were moved to the Austins Ferry campus. This allowed Guilford Young College (Grades 11 and 12) to be established on the Barrack Street site. Grades 9 and 10 still ran in 1995, and only Grade 10 was offered in 1996.

After 1996, St Virgil's College ceased to operate any of its classes on the Barrack Street campus. From then on, Grades 7–10 were all taught at the Austins Ferry campus, and because of the discontinuation of Grades 11–12, many students moved on to the newly formed Guilford Young College for their pre-tertiary years.

In August 1995, permission was granted for St Peter's School to become the St Virgil's College Junior School from 1996 onwards. The Junior School now accommodates boys from Grades 3–6 and operates on the old St Peter's School site in Patrick Street.

The current Principal of St Virgil's College is John Franzin, who was appointed in 2022. Damian Messer left the college in 2021 to carry out other goals and explore different paths. In 2009, Christopher D. Smith left the college to carry out higher duties. Franzin is now the full-time principal, with Daniel Lapolla as the Vice-Principal teacher of the college, who replaced Heidi Senior in 2021.

In 2019, it was announced that St Virgil's College would expand from a Year 3-10 school to a kinder to Year 12 school. Works are currently underway to develop both the Hobart and Austins Ferry sites in order for the school to cater for the new students by 2023.

Curriculum 
St Virgil's College offers a broad curriculum, with the areas of literacy and numeracy of high importance. Emphasis is also placed on the languages, science, social sciences and physical education.
The College places the most emphasis on its teaching of religious education, which is central to every student's studies.

Co-curriculum

Sport 
St Virgil's College is a member of the Sports Association of Tasmanian Independent Schools (SATIS). Much importance is placed on sport at St Virgil's College. All students are encouraged to participate in at least one sport during their time at the college.

The college has had much success on the sporting field throughout its history. Most recent is the college's domination of the Tasmanian State and Southern School's Athletics. The college's athletics team have won the SATIS (Sports Association of Tasmanian Independent Schools) Boy's junior title 10 years in a row, and the Southern SATIS title 10 years in a row as well.

Other sports on offer at St Virgil's include canoe polo, cross-country, cricket, football, hockey, rowing, soccer, swimming, tennis, touch football, water polo, basketball, rugby, badminton, squash, sailing, and athletics.

Music 
The college has two teacher-coordinated stage bands accommodating players of different skill levels. St Virgil's also offers individual and small group instrumental tuition for those wishing to acquire the skills to excel further than a band setting can allow them. The college also has the facilities to accommodate students wishing to start their own rock band.

The St Virgil's College Senior Stage Band has won numerous awards for its efforts at various eisteddfods around Hobart. The Senior Band specialises in the areas of contemporary rock, jazz, blues and Latin music. The band often performs at school fairs, school productions and masses. In late 2005, the Senior Band, along with the jazz quartet, toured Melbourne, performing at various schools and other venues. It is currently organizing and arranging plans to go on a similar tour of Melbourne in 2007. The Senior Stage band has also taken part in many St Virgil's school musicals.

The band currently has between 10 and 15 members, and mainly features the trumpet, trombone and saxophone (alto, tenor and baritone), with a rhythm backing (drums, guitar and keyboard).

Other co-curricular clubs 
St Virgil's College also offers a wide range of co-curricular activities outside of sport and music. Most notably a robotics club who participated in the FIRST Lego League and the FIRST Tech Challenge in 2020. St Virgil's College also offers a chess club. This was founded in 2018 and made the Australian national championships in 2020.

House system 
As with most Australian schools, St Virgil's utilises a house system. The school houses are:
Doyle — Blue
Dwyer — Green
Hessian (formerly Virgilian House) — Red
Joyce (formerly College House) — Yellow

Notable alumni 
An alumnus of St Virgil's College is known as an 'Old Virgilian' and may elect to join the school's alumni association, the Old Virgilians' Association. The Association was established in 1916 as a way for Old Virgilians to meet regularly and keep in touch with news about the college. Some notable Old Virgilians include:

Entertainment, media and the arts
 Anthony Ackroyd – comedian and writer
 Geoff "Jeff" Hook – [cartoonist
 Tom Lewis – author, military historian and naval officer
 Toby Leonard Moore – actor
 Don Sharp – film director 
 Peter Damian Williams – author and military historian

Military
 Major General Michael Crane  – Commander of all Australian Forces in the Middle East area of operations (Iraq)

 
Politics, public service and the law

 Henry Cosgrove  – Judge of the Supreme Court of Tasmania
 William Cox – Governor of Tasmania
 Anthony Fletcher – former member of the Legislative Council

 Peter Heerey – Justice of the Federal Court of Australia
 Pierre Hutton – diplomat
Gintaras Kantvilas – scientist (lichenologist)  & state public servant
 Paul Lennon – 42nd Premier of Tasmania
 Doug Lowe – 35th Premier of Tasmania
 Kenneth Lowrie  – former member of the Legislative Council and Glenorchy Alderman
 Albert Ogilvie – 28th Premier of Tasmania

Religion
 Adrian Leo Doyle – Archbishop of Hobart
 Michael Tate – Catholic priest and former Federal Justice Minister

Sport
 Scott Bowden – Olympic mountain bike rider and road cyclist
 Scott Brennan – Australian rowing Olympic gold medallist and world champion
 Sean Clingeleffer – cricket player; Tasmanian wicketkeeper
 Sam Darley – Australian rules footballer
 Michael Di Venuto – cricket player for the Tasmanian Tigers and Derbyshire County
 Brodie Holland – Australian rules footballer for Collingwood Magpies
 Simon Hollingsworth – 400 metre hurdles 2X [Olympian and 3X Commonwealth Games representative; Rhodes Scholar
 Caleb Jewell – cricket player for North Hobart, Tasmanian Tigers and Hobart Hurricanes
 Oliver O'Halloran – youngest person to fly around world solo, unassisted, completed in 2017
 Jack Riewoldt – Australian rules footballer for Richmond Tigers
 Sid Taberlay – Olympic mountain bike rider
 Ted Terry — outstanding schoolboy athlete, winner of the 1925 Burnie Gift, and  – Australian rules footballer for St Kilda Saints
 Tristan Thomas – Australian representative to the 2012 Olympics in athletics
 Peter Toogood – former Australian amateur golf champion

See also 

 List of schools in Tasmania
 List of Christian Brothers schools
 Education in Tasmania
 Catholic education in Australia

References

External links

 St Virgil's College Website
 Catholic Education Tasmania
 Department of Education Tasmania

Catholic primary schools in Hobart
Catholic secondary schools in Hobart
Educational institutions established in 1911
Congregation of Christian Brothers secondary schools in Australia
Boys' schools in Tasmania
Junior School Heads Association of Australia Member Schools
1911 establishments in Australia
Congregation of Christian Brothers primary schools in Australia